The Estonia national baseball team is the national baseball team of Estonia. The team represents Estonia in international competitions. The team is formed from players from the three Estonian baseball teams, the Keila Pitbulls, Keila Sox, and the Kiili Pantriid.

References

National baseball teams in Europe
Baseball
Baseball in Estonia